These Things Move in Threes is the first album from indie rock band Mumm-Ra, released on 28 May 2007, and leaked onto the internet on the 17 May. Before the release of the album, three songs were taken as singles, whilst "Song B" was released on the EP, Black Hurts Day and the Night Rolls On, and had a music video created.

Track listing
All tracks composed by Mumm-Ra
 "Now or Never"
 "Out of the Question"
 "These Things Move in Threes"
 "She's Got You High"
 "Song B"
 "The Sick Deal"
 "Light Up This Room"
 "Starlight"
 "This Is Easy"
 "What Would Steve Do?"
 "Down Down Down"

B-sides

From Out of the Question
"Clocks Tick Louder at the Dead of Night"
"When the Lights Go Out"
"In Between Days" (cover of The Cure)

From What Would Steve Do?
"Cute As"
"Without You"
"What Would Steve Do?" (Floorboard Mix)

From She's Got You High
"Indiscrete"
"Song E"
"Out of the Question" (live)
"There She Is" (acoustic)

Personnel
Mumm-Ra
 James "Tate" Arguile - guitar
 Niall Buckler - bass, vocals
 James "Noo" New - lead vocals, backing guitar, keyboards
 Oli Frost - guitar, vocals
 Gareth "the Rock" Jennings - drums
 Tommy "B" Bowen - keyboards
with:
The London Session Orchestra - strings on "The Sick Deal"
Wil Malone - string arrangement
Technical
Clive Goddard - engineer
James Taylor - art direction, cover illustration

References
http://www.sonybmgmusic.co.uk/releases/473/

Mumm-Ra (band) albums
2007 debut albums
Columbia Records albums
Albums produced by Youth (musician)
albums recorded at Olympic Sound Studios